Phayu is a district (amphoe) in the central part of Sisaket province, northeastern Thailand.

History
The minor district (king amphoe) was created on 30 April 1994, when five tambons were split off from Mueang Sisaket district. On 11 October 1997 it was upgraded to a full district.

Geography
Neighboring districts are (from the north clockwise): Mueang Sisaket, Nam Kliang, Si Rattana, Phrai Bueng, and Wang Hin.

Administration
The district is divided into five sub-districts (tambons), which are further subdivided into 65 villages (mubans). Phayu is a township (thesaban tambon) which covers parts of tambon Phayu. There are a further five tambon administrative organizations (TAO).

References

External links
amphoe.com

Phayu